The 2010 Telus Cup was Canada's 32nd annual national midget 'AAA' hockey championship, played April 19–25, 2010 at Lévis, Quebec.  The Notre Dame Hounds defeated the Mississauga Reps 3–2 in the gold medal game to win their second straight national title and fourth overall.

The tournament featured four future National Hockey League players:  Morgan Rielly,  Slater Koekkoek, Liam O'Brien and Malcolm Subban.  Koekkoek was named the tournament's Top Defenceman and Most Valuable Player.

Teams

Round robin

Standings

Scores

Notre Dame 5 - Red Deer 3
Collège Antoine-Girouard 3 - St. John's 3
Lévis 4 - Mississauga 1
Mississauga 5 - Red Deer 2
Notre Dame 2 - Collège Antoine-Girouard 2
St. John's 6 - Lévis 2
Collège Antoine-Girouard 6 - Mississauga 4
Notre Dame 3 - St. John's 3
Red Deer 4 - Lévis 1
Collège Antoine-Girouard 6 - Red Deer 1
Mississauga 4 - St. John's 1
Notre Dame 6 - Lévis 4
Notre Dame 5 - Mississauga 5
St. John's 7 - Red Deer 2
Collège Antoine-Girouard 6 - Lévis 0

Playoffs

Semifinals
Notre Dame 5 - St. John's 3
Mississauga 4 - Collège Antoine-Girouard 3 (OT)

Bronze medal game
St. John's 5 - Collège Antoine-Girouard 4

Gold medal game
Notre Dame 3 - Mississauga 2

Individual awards
Most Valuable Player: Slater Koekkoek (Notre Dame)
Top Scorer: Zach O'Brien (St. John's)
Top Forward: Zach O'Brien (St. John's)
Top Defenceman: Slater Koekkoek (Notre Dame)
Top Goaltender: Scott Bray (St. John's)
Most Sportsmanlike Player: Alexandre Lemieux (Collège Antoine-Girouard)

Road to the Telus Cup

Atlantic Region
Tournament held March 31-April 3, 2010 at Halifax, Nova Scotia

Championship Game
St. John's 6 - Miramichi 3
St. John's advances to Telus Cup

Quebec
Ligue de Hockey Midget AAA du Quebec Championship
Gaulois du Collège Antoine-Girouard vs Lions du Lac St-Louis
Best-of-7 series played March 30-April 6, 2010
Game 1: Collège Antoine-Girouard 4 - Lac St-Louis 3
Game 2: Collège Antoine-Girouard 8 - Lac St-Louis 3
Game 3: Collège Antoine-Girouard 3 - Lac St-Louis 2
Game 4: Lac St-Louis 4 - Collège Antoine-Girouard 3
Game 5: Collège Antoine-Girouard 2 - Lac St-Louis 1
Collège Antoine-Girouard wins series and advances to Telus Cup

Central Region
Tournament held March 29-April 4, 2010 at Vaughan, Ontario

Semi-finals
Ottawa 67's 7 - Oakville 5
Mississauga 2 - Sault Ste. Marie 1

Championship Game
Mississauga 7 - Ottawa 67's 3
Mississauga advances to Telus Cup

West Region
Tournament held April 1–4, 2010 at Morden, Manitoba

Championship Game
Notre Dame 6 - Pembina Valley 3
Notre Dame advances to Telus Cup

Pacific Region
Red Deer Optimist Rebels vs Vancouver North West Giants
Best-of-3 series played April 2–4, 2010
Game 1: Vancouver 7 - Red Deer 4
Game 2: Red Deer 5 - Vancouver 2
Game 2: Red Deer 2 - Vancouver 1
Red Deer wins series and advances to Telus Cup

See also
Telus Cup

External links
2010 Telus Cup Home Page
Team Notes

Telus Cup
Telus Cup
Lévis, Quebec
April 2010 sports events in Canada
Ice hockey competitions in Quebec
2010 in Quebec